Serafino Tramezzini or Tramazzini (Ascoli Piceno, 21 January 1859 - 1893) was an Italian sculptor. He trained under professor Giorgio Paci in Ascoli Piceno. He then moved to Rome where he worked under sculptor Giulio Moschetti. He made a marble bust of Venudio Basso, for the palazzo comunale of Ascoli.

The city also commissioned a memorial plaque commemorating the visit of Garibaldi to Ascoli in 1848, to give a patriotic speech. Tramazzini in his hometown produced many funereal monuments and marble decorations and plaques.

References

1859 births
1893 deaths
People from Ascoli Piceno
19th-century Italian sculptors
Italian male sculptors
19th-century Italian male artists